Joann Marie Slater (born November 20, 1995), known professionally as Ann Marie, is an American singer signed to Interscope Records. She is best known for her single "Secret", which has garnered over 50 million views on YouTube and peaked at number 22 on the Billboard Hot R&B Songs chart. Her debut EP Pretty Psycho was released on July 10, 2019.

Early life 
Ann Marie was born Joann Marie Slater in Englewood, Chicago, Illinois. She began singing at an early age, crediting her uncle for encouraging her to recite Whitney Houston's "My Love Is Your Love" repeatedly.

Legal issues 
In December 2020, Slater was charged with possession of a gun and aggravated assault with a deadly weapon in connection to an Atlanta hotel shooting of childhood friend and alleged boyfriend, Jonathon "Sandillo" Wright. Slater allegedly told an officer that a "gun fell off the table in the hotel room where the shooting happened". She was later released on bond.

Influences 
Slater has stated that she draws inspiration from 90s R&B, especially from artists like Aaliyah, Jagged Edge, SWV, Xscape

Discography

Studio albums

EPs

Mixtapes

Singles 

Pain Never Looked This Good (Day) released 2022
Pain Never Looked This Good (Night) released 2022

Tours

Headlining 
 The Tripolar Tour (2019)
 Moon Boy Tour (2021) with Yung Bleu

References 
Ann Marie | Independent Artist in 2022

Living people
1995 births
Interscope Records artists
21st-century African-American women singers
African-American women singer-songwriters
American contemporary R&B singers
American people of English descent
Singer-songwriters from Illinois